Huarmicochas Lakes (possibly from Quechua warmi woman, qucha lake) are a group of lakes in Peru located in the Junín Region, Jauja Province, Canchayllo District. They're located east of the Pariacaca mountain range.

References 

Lakes of Peru
Lakes of Junín Region